Parazyxomma is a genus of dragonfly in the family Libellulidae. It contains only one species, Parazyxomma flavicans  - the Banded Duskdarter. It is widespread and common in much of west Africa and central Africa.

References

Libellulidae
Anisoptera genera
Taxa named by Elliot Pinhey
Taxonomy articles created by Polbot